Fritz Greiner (1879–1933) was an Austrian film actor.

Selected filmography

 Der Einäugige (1916)
 Der Klub der Einäugigen (1917) - Nick Carter
 Der schwarze Jack (1918) - Cowboy Schwarzer Jack
 The Hunter of Fall (1918) - Blasi
 Der Herrgott am Wege (1918)
 Der Schattenspieler (1919)
 Sodoms Töchter (1919)
 Storms in May (1919) - Domimi
 Doktor Steffens seltsamster Fall (1919)
 Der Edelweisskönig (1919) - Jörg Finkenbauer
 Das Ende des Abenteurers Paolo de Caspado (1920)
 Panic in the House of Ardon (1920) - Stuart Webbs
 Das ganze Sein ist flammend Leid (1920) - Bankkassier Jürgen
 Der Mann auf der Flasche (1920) - Emir Mohamed Darasche-Koh
 The War of the Oxen (1920) - Richtmann Runotter
 Der Kopf des Gonzalez (1920)
 The Monastery's Hunter (1920) - Wolfrat Polzer
 Der Einäugige (1921) - Der Einäugige
 Der Brand im Varieté Mascotte (1921)
 Der Überfall auf den Europa-Express (1921) - Der Rotbärtige
 Die Wahrsagerin von Paris (1921)
 Die Schreckensnacht im Hause Clarque (1921)
 Der Verfluchte (1921) - Räber
 The Chain of Guilt (1921) - Robert Wit
 The Black Face (1921)
 Oberst Rokschanin (192)
 Nathan the Wise (1922) - Sultan Saladin
 Kauft Mariett-Aktien (1922)
 Im Rausche der Milliarden (1922)
 Zwischen Flammen und Bestien (1923)
 Wo Menschen Frieden finden (1923)
 Lachendes Weinen (1923)
 Dr. Sacrobosco, der große Unheimliche (1923)
 The Woman from the Orient (1923) - Emir Said
 The Emperor's Old Clothes (1923)
 The Way to the Light (1923)
 Das rollende Schicksal (1923)
 To a Woman of Honour (1924)
 Der Löwe von Venedig (1924)
 Two Children (1924) - Niels, Chorist
 The Pearls of Doctor Talmadge (1925)
 Ihre letzte Dummheit (1925)
 Wallenstein (1925, part 1, 2)
 Zigano (1925) - Statthalter Ganossa
 What the Stones Tell (1925) - Andreas Hofer
 Goetz von Berlichingen of the Iron Hand (1925)
 Adventure on the Night Express (1925) - Variété-Direktor
 Die Tragödie zweier Menschen (1925) - Gutsbesitzer Andreas Erler
 The Fallen (1926) - Konrad, Fabrikarbeiter
 Manon Lescaut (1926) - Marquis of Bli
 The Schimeck Family (1926) - Chauffeur
 Circus Romanelli (1926) - Karussellbesitzer
 The Black Pierrot (1926) - Don Gil den Montavan
 The Eleven Schill Officers (1926) - Freiherr von Mallwitz
 Vienna, How it Cries and Laughs (1926) - Leopold Gruber - Haus / Fuhrwerksbesitzer
 Our Emden (1926)
 Circus Beely (1927) - Commissioner Bull
 Klettermaxe (1927)
 His Greatest Bluff (1927) - Hennessy
 I Was a Student at Heidelberg (1927)
 Moral (1928) - Justizrat Hauser
 Doña Juana (1928) - Ramons Freund Osorio
 Luther (1928)
 The Criminal of the Century (1928) - Capitain Tawil
 Robert and Bertram (1928) - the director of the circus
 The Exploits of the Emden (1928)
 Modern Pirates (1928) - Der Unbekannte
 Hungarian Rhapsody (1928) - Gutsverwalter Doczy - ihr Vater
 Number 17 (1928) - Shelldrake
 Hurrah! I Live! (1928)
 Fight of the Tertia (1929) - Schutzmann Holzapfel
 Bright Eyes (1929) - Henri, Oberkellner im Palais de Luxe
 The Love of the Brothers Rott (1929)
 Andreas Hofer (1929) - Andreas Hofer 
 My Daughter's Tutor (1930) - Schiffskontrolleur
 Das Donkosakenlied (1930) - Räuberhauptmann
 The Immortal Vagabond (1930)
 Im Kampf mit der Unterwelt (1930) - Watts
 Darling of the Gods (1930)
 Wellen der Leidenschaft (1930) - Kölgis, Schmugglerführer
 Leutnant warst Du einst bei deinen Husaren (1930)
 Road to Rio (1931)
 Tropical Nights (1931) - Schomberg
 Elisabeth of Austria (1931)
 The Squeaker (1931) - Falschspieler
 The Theft of the Mona Lisa (1931)
 A Waltz by Strauss (1931) - Bäckermeister Deisinger
 Die Mutter der Kompagnie (1931) - Herr Professor
 Liebeskommando (1931)
 Viennese Waltz (1932) - the director of the theater
 Once There Was a Waltz (1932) - Fiakerkutscher
 Cruiser Emden (1932) - Mertens
 Strafsache van Geldern (1932)
 The Black Hussar (1932) - Corporal
 Kampf um Blond (1933)
 The Emperor's Waltz (1933)
 S.A.-Mann Brand (1933) - Mr. Baumann
 Happy Days in Aranjuez (1933)
 Ein Unsichtbarer geht durch die Stadt (1933) - Hauswirt von Frau Bergmann
 The Fugitive from Chicago (1933)
 Drei Kaiserjäger (1933) - Nuller (final film role)

External links

1879 births
1933 deaths
Austrian male film actors
Austrian male silent film actors
Male actors from Vienna
20th-century Austrian male actors